Bequia English is the local dialect of English spoken on Bequia, an island in Saint Vincent and the Grenadines. It belongs to the group of Caribbean English varieties.

Phonology

Consonants 
Word-initially /t/ and /d/ are dental. Word-final /t/ can be sometimes fully released and sometimes fully deleted, such as in but [bʌ] and about [əbaʷ]. Word-medially /t/ can occur as either a stop or glottal stop, hence after is either [aftə] or [afʔə].
Word-initially H is variably present. The fricatives are pronounced as dentals: 'think' [tɪŋk], 'there' [dɛ]. Nasal backing is common after back vowels: "Hamilton" sounds like [hamɪltɔŋ]. /l/ is normally light in all positions, the /r/ is a retroflex [ɹ] and rhoticity is variable. 
/str/ is pronounced as /ʃtr/: industry is [ɪndʌʃtri]. Final clusters may be devoiced (kids: [kɪts]) and final stops in clusters can be deleted (respect: [rispɛk]). There is restricted metathesis: words like ask, crisp and crispy are pronounced as [æks], [krɪps], and [krɪpsi]; but mask is pronounced as [ma:s].
/k/ and /g/ tend to be palatalized: Coast Guard [kʲo:s gʲa:d].

Vowels 
The vowels in Kit and Dress are usually [ɪ] and [ɛ], and the vowel in Kit is sometimes lowered to [ɛ] (miracle: [mɛɹəkl]). The vowel in Trap is either [a] or [æ]. The Foot vowel is usually [ʊ], but sometimes [ɔ], and the Lot vowel is usually [ɑ], but sometimes [a]. The vowel in Strut is normally [ʌ], but at times [ɔ] (cup: [kɔp]). 
The vowels in Fleece and in Goose tend to occur as [i:] and [u:], and the Face and Goat vowels tend to occur as [e:] and [o:], but they can occasionally be [eə] and [oə]. The Bath vowel tends to occur as [a:], though [æ] can also be heard. The Cloth, Thought and Palm vowels tend to occur as [a].
The diphthong in Price is either [aɪ], [ɔɪ] or [əɪ], the diphthong in Mouth is either [aʊ], [ɔʊ] or [əʊ]. The Choice diphthong is usually [ɔɪ], but can be realized as [aɪ]. Hence, choice can be heard as [tʃaɪs] and price can be heard as [pɹɔɪs].
The Nurse vowel is [ə], [ɜ]or [ɔ]; the Near vowels is usually [i:], but can be merged with the Square vowel [e:]. The Start vowel is either [a:] or [ɑ:], the Cure vowel is [ɔ:], and the North and Force vowels are usually merged, though lord tends to sound like [la:d].

Rhythm
According to Meer, Bequia English has limited vowel reduction and a high tendency toward syllable-timed stress pattern.

References

Dialects of English
Languages of Saint Vincent and the Grenadines
Caribbean English